Mohamed Ahmed Abu Sobea (born 1907, date of death unknown) was an Egyptian long-distance runner. He competed in the men's 5000 metres at the 1936 Summer Olympics.

References

1907 births
Year of death missing
Athletes (track and field) at the 1936 Summer Olympics
Egyptian male long-distance runners
Olympic athletes of Egypt
Place of birth missing